Bezdan is a village located in Bačka, Vojvodina, Serbia. It is situated in the Sombor municipality, West Bačka District. The village has a Hungarian ethnic majority and its population numbers at 5,263 people (2002 census).

History
It was first mentioned in 1305 under the name of Battyan, while in 1341 it was mentioned as Betsan. The village was destroyed during an Ottoman invasion in the 16th century. With the establishment of Habsburg rule, the village was settled by Hungarians, Poles, Czechs and Germans. The first church in the village was built in 1755, and the current one was constructed in 1846.

Demographics

Historical population
1961: 6,813
1971: 6,427
1981: 6,085
1991: 5,472
2002: 5,263
2011: 4,623

Ethnic groups
The ethnic groups in the village as of 2002 census:
Hungarians = 2,983 (56.68%)
Serbs = 1,256 (23.87%)
Croats = 424 (8.06%)
Yugoslavs = 141 (2.68%)
others.

See also 
 List of places in Serbia
 List of cities, towns and villages in Vojvodina

References

 Slobodan Ćurčić, Broj stanovnika Vojvodine, Novi Sad, 1996.

External links

 
  History of Bezdan
 www.soinfo.org

Places in Bačka
Sombor
West Bačka District
Hungarian communities in Serbia